The 41st Signal Regiment is an inactive signals regiment of the Italian Army. The unit was formed in 1953 as a battalion, which operated and maintained the army's telecommunication network in the Aosta, Liguria, Lombardy, and Piedmont regions. In 1975 the battalion was named for the Col du Fréjus and received its own flag. In 1993 the battalion entered the newly formed 41st Signal Regiment, which was disbanded in 1998. After the regiment was disbanded the Battalion "Frejus" was transferred to the 32nd Signal Regiment, which operates and maintains the army's telecommunication network in northeastern Italy.

History 
On 1 October 1957 the XLI Signal Battalion was formed in Turin with the personnel and materiel of the existing 1st, 2nd, and 3rd territorial signal companies. The battalion consisted of a command, a command and services platoon, and three signals companies. The battalion was assigned to the I Territorial Military Command in Turin.

During the 1975 army reform the army disbanded the regimental level and newly independent battalions were granted for the first time their own flags. During the reform signal battalions were renamed for mountain passes. On 1 December 1975 the XLI Signal Battalion was renamed to 41st Signal Battalion "Frejus". The battalion consisted of a command, a command and services platoon, and three signal companies. The battalion was assigned to the Signal Command of the Northwestern Military Region and operated and maintained the army's telecommunication network in the Aosta, Liguria (minus the province of La Spezia), Lombardy (minus the provinces of Brescia and Mantua), and Piedmont regions. On 12 November 1976 the battalion was granted a flag by decree 846 of the President of the Italian Republic Giovanni Leone.

On 30 September 1987 the battalion consisted of a command, command and services company, and the 1st and 2nd TLC infrastructure managing companies. On 1 October 1988 the battalion added the 3rd Field Support Company.

On 19 September 1993 the 41st Signal Battalion "Frejus" lost its autonomy and the next day the battalion entered the newly formed 41st Signal Regiment as Battalion "Frejus". On the same date the flag of the 41st Signal Battalion "Frejus" was transferred from the battalion to the 41st Signal Regiment.

On 30 September 1998 the 41st Signal Regiment was disbanded and the next day the Battalion "Frejus" joined the 32nd Signal Regiment, while the flag of the 41st Signal Regiment was transferred to the Shrine of the Flags in the Vittoriano in Rome.

Current structure 
As of 2023 the Battalion "Frejus" consists of:

  Battalion "Frejus", in Turin
 Command and Logistic Support Company
 3rd Area Support Signal Company
 4th C4 Support Signal Company

The Command and Logistic Support Company fields the following platoons: C3 Platoon, Transport and Materiel Platoon, Medical Platoon, and Commissariat Platoon.

References

Signal Regiments of Italy